Ottleya rigida, synonyms Lotus rigidus and Acmispon rigidus, is a flowering plant in the pea family (Fabaceae), native to the southwestern United States and northwestern Mexico. It is known as shrubby deervetch or desert rock-pea. It is found in the Mojave Desert and Sonoran Desert.

Description

It is a perennial herbaceous plant growing to 0.5–1.5 m tall. The leaves are irregularly pinnate or palmate with three or four leaflets, 5–15 mm long. The flowers are yellow, turning red or purple as they age.

Distribution and habitat
Ottleya rigida is found in the southwestern United States (Arizona, California, Nevada and Utah) and in northwestern Mexico. It occurs in the Mojave Desert north to Inyo County, California, and in the Sonoran Desert south to the Baja California Peninsula. It is found on dry slopes and desert dry washes below 6,000 ft above sea level, in Joshua tree woodland, and in pinyon-juniper woodland plant communities.

References

External links
 USDA Plants Profile
 Photo gallery
 Jepson Flora Project: Lotus rigidus

Loteae
Flora of Arizona
Flora of California
Flora of Nevada
Flora of Utah
Flora of Northwestern Mexico
North American desert flora
Flora of the California desert regions
Flora without expected TNC conservation status